Tulsipur State was a small kingdom in  the Awadh region of India that became the United Provinces of Agra and Oudh under the British Raj and Dundwa Range of the Siwaliks in the Dang and Deukhuri Valleys that became part of the Kingdom of Nepal. It was one of the areas traditionally inhabited by the Tharu people.

The Tulsipur kingdom was about 150 by 150 miles. It bordered Salyan Rajya (Nepal) and Pyuthan (Nepal) in the north, Balarampur Principality (India) in the south, Madi Khola (Nepal) and Arnala River (Basti, India) in the east and Bahraich (India) in the west.

Until annexation in 1786 the Tulsipur kingdom counted as one of the Baise (22) confederated principalities centered in the  Hill Region.

History
Tradition traces the origins of Tulsipur to the legendary Sravasti Kingdom.

The Rajas of Tulsipur-Dang belonged to the Chauhan clan with the title Thakuri. From Chaughera (near Ghorahi, Dang) they ruled the Dang and Deukhuri Valleys as well as territories around Tulsipur State south of the Siwaliks, now in India.

During the unification of Nepal, the part in the Siwaliks and the valleys to the north were ceded to Nepal. Remaining lands became known as Tulsipur State, a feudatory state of Oudh in India.

The ruling family engaged in internecine warfare for control of the estate during the 1850s and, in 1856, an armed force was sent by the British East India Company (EIC) to put pressure on the raja. He was one of several talukdars who had been refusing to pass on the land revenues exacted by him as agent for the EIC, and the EIC was now seeking not only current revenues but also the arrears. During the Indian Rebellion of 1857, 500 of the talukdar's men had formed a part of the rebel force at the Siege of Lucknow and the Rani of Tulsipur (Ishwari Devi) was a prominent anti-establishment figure. After the rebellion, Tulsipur State was annexed by the  British Raj, becoming part of the North-Western Provinces and Oudh, one of the Provinces of British India.

References 
Citations

Bibliography

 

Awadh
Empires and kingdoms of India
Former monarchies of Asia
Subdivisions of British India
History of Nepal
History of Uttar Pradesh
16th-century establishments in Nepal
19th-century disestablishments in Nepal